The Russian 2022 Laws Establishing War Censorship and Prohibiting Anti-War Statements and Calls for Sanctions is a group of federal laws promulgated by the Russian government during the Russian invasion of Ukraine. These laws establish administrative (Law No.31-FZ, Law No.62-FZ) and criminal (Law No.32-FZ, Law No.63-FZ) punishments for the dissemination of "unreliable information" about the Russian Armed Forces and other Russian state bodies and their operations, prohibit "discrediting" the Russian military and other Russian state bodies, and prohibit calls for sanctions against Russia. These laws are a further extension of Russian fake news laws. The adoption of these laws caused the mass exodus of foreign media from Russia and the termination of the activity of independent Russian media. In March 2023, a new law was signed extending criminal liability to "discrediting" and spreading "fakes" against volunteers and mercenaries.

Overview

The Federal Law of 4 March 2022 No.31-FZ (adopted by State Duma on 4 March 2022, approved by Federation Council on 4 March 2022, signed by President of Russia on 4 March 2022) supplemented the Code of the Russian Federation on Administrative Offenses with articles 20.3.3 and 20.3.4. The article 20.3.3 provides huge administrative fines for natural persons and juridical persons for a "discrediting" of Russian Armed Forces and its operations, including the calls for prevention of the use of Russian Armed Forces for the interests of the Russian Federation. The article 20.3.4 provides huge administrative fines for natural persons and juridical persons for a calls to impose sanctions against Russia, Russian citizens or Russian legal entities.

The Federal Law of 4 March 2022 No.32-FZ (adopted by State Duma on 4 March 2022, approved by Federation Council on 4 March 2022, signed by President of Russia on 4 March 2022) supplemented the Criminal Code of the Russian Federation with articles 207.3, 280.3 and 284.2. The article 207.3 provides imprisonment for up to 15 years for a dissemination of unreliable information about Russian Armed Forces and its operations. The article 280.3 provides imprisonment for up to 5 years for a "discrediting" of Russian Armed Forces and its operations, including the calls for prevention of the use of Russian Armed Forces for the interests of the Russian Federation. The article 284.2 provides imprisonment for up to 3 years for a calls to impose sanctions against Russia, Russian citizens or Russian legal entities.

The laws No.31-FZ and No.32-FZ use so-called Dadin scheme: a first call against the use of Russian Armed Forces or the call for sanctions on Russia is punishable under the Code of the Russian Federation on Administrative Offenses, a second one is punishable under the Criminal Code of the Russian Federation. A dissemination of unreliable information about Russian Armed Forces and its operations is punishable under the Criminal Code of the Russian Federation only. According to the reigning approach in Russian law-enforcement practice, a violations, committed through Internet publications, are considered continuing violations that allows authorities to persecute people for texts published before aforementioned laws entered into force; statute of limitations will start to run after a removing relevant texts.

The Federal Laws of 25 March 2022 No.62-FZ and No.63-FZ (adopted by State Duma on 22 March 2022, approved by Federation Council on 23 March 2022, signed by President of Russia on 25 March 2022) amended the article 20.3.3 of the Code of the Russian Federation on Administrative Offenses (Law No.62-FZ) and the article 207.3 of the Criminal Code of the Russian Federation (Law No.63-FZ). These amendments made punishable "discrediting" of exercise of the powers, carrying out by not only Russian Armed Forces but any Russian state body (including National Guard, Federal Security Service, Ministry of Emergency Situations, General Prosecutor's Office, Investigative Committee, Ministry of Foreign Affairs) outside Russian territory.

In March 2023, a new law was signed establishing criminal liability for "discrediting" and spreading "fakes" against all participants in the "special military operation", in particular mercenaries and volunteers fighting for Russia. Article 280.3 ("discrediting") was amended to increase the maximum prison term from five years to seven years. Article 207.3 ("fakes") was amended to increase terms from three years to five years under the first part of the law, with the second and third parts remaining unchanged, at 10 and 15 years, respectively. Article 20.3.3 of the Code on Administrative Offenses is also amended.

Effect on media

Domestic media
Many Russian media outlets were forced to stop covering the Russian invasion of Ukraine because of this bill, including Colta.ru, "Snob" online magazine, Znak.com, "The Bell" online magazine, and Novaya Gazeta. Dozhd said it was temporarily suspending operations due to the enactment of the aforementioned law. Radio Liberty announced that it would stop working in Russia due to the new law on fakes, but would continue to cover events in Ukraine while abroad. Certain foreign media outlets were also blocked within Russia.

According to Agentstvo, over 150 journalists left Russia by 7 March since Putin signed the bill into law.

On 7 April 2022, to avoid prosecutions under the law, journalists from Novaya Gazeta announced the launch of Novaya Gazeta Europe, with its editor-in-chief, Kirill Martynov, stating that Novaya Gazeta Europe would be independent from Novaya Gazeta "both legally and in practice", with its newsroom consisting of staffers who have left Russia.

As recently as 30 April 2022 Animators against war broadcast on YouTube episode number six of their campaign against the invasion although it attempts to fly under the radar. With only a Ukrainian flag and the face of Putin represented pictorially in a two-minute short feature, the impact of these censorship laws is evident.

External Russian-language media
Oleg Kuvaev, a Russian artist based in Israel and creator of cartoon character and series Masyanya, criticised the Russian invasion of Ukraine as early as 22 March 2022 with the broadcast of episode #160. In the episode, the characters compare Putin with Adolf Hitler. At the end of the episode, Masyanya delivers to Putin a Katana, implying he commits seppuku. Roskomnadzor subsequently banned the cartoon.

A DDoS attack was launched against Kuvaev-controlled assets two days after the regulator made its threat about the episode because it "discredits the Russian Federation's armed forces" and "contains false information of social importance about the ongoing military operation to defend the Donetsk and Luhansk People's Republics", but it is not immediately apparent how the Russian government will be able to enforce its measures as the series is monetized as well on YouTube. Criminal punishment of people who "deliberately distribute false news" is mandated by the laws, but the limits to jurisdiction still apply. 

Episode #161, aired on 12 May 2022, showed explanations for children the fact that what they saw with their own eyes was not to be spoken aloud for fear of drawing the Russian authorities anger and lust for administrative violence on the family.

Episode #162, uploaded on 11 July 2022, depicted a Chinese attack on Russia and bombs falling on Novgorod, Moscow and Tver. In the animation, the Chinese Communist Party leader wants to denazify Russia and recuperate Chinese lands, and observes that Russian is not a real language, but rather a derivative from the Ukrainian language. The animation sometimes superimposes cartoon characters on a background of photographs of real life monuments and buildings, such as for example the Donetsk Academic Regional Drama Theater in Mariupol. The animation concludes with a parenthetical observation that "this war" is the shame of Russia and that Russia will as a result suffer damnation for centuries.

Application of law
 
On 16 March 2022, Russian socialite and food blogger Veronika Belotserkovskaya became the first individual charged under the "fakes law".

On 22 March 2022, Russian television journalist Alexander Nevzorov was charged under the law after he published information that Russian forces shelled a maternity hospital in Mariupol. Nevzorov said that Vladimir Putin's "regime is not going to spare anyone, and that any attempts to comprehend the criminal war [in Ukraine] will end in prison."

On 25 March 2022, Russian journalist Izabella Yevloyeva was charged under the "fakes law" after sharing a post on social media that described the "Z" symbol as being "synonymous with aggression, death, pain and shameless manipulation".

On 13 April 2022, Russian journalist Mikhail Afanasyev, editor-in-chief of the online magazine Novy Fokus, was detained by police over its reporting on the war in Ukraine. He faces up to 10 years in prison. Afanasyev was twice awarded with the Andrei Sakharov Prize "For Journalism as a Deed." 

According to OVD-Info, over 400 people were detained or fined by April under the laws prohibiting "fake" information about the military.

Sergei Klokov, a Moscow policeman with Ukrainian roots, who is originally from Bucha in Ukraine, was arrested after telling co-workers what he had heard from Ukrainian friends and family about the Russian invasion. One of Klokov’s colleagues said in the interrogations: "He said that we had no right to attack and go to war with them, and although I tried to explain to him that there is no war, he did not listen to me. I can’t explain why he became so radical."

On 22 April 2022, Russian opposition politician Vladimir Kara-Murza was charged by a Russian court for spreading of “false” information about the Russian military. The reason for the criminal case against Kara-Murza was his March 15 speech to the Arizona House of Representatives, in which he denounced the war in Ukraine.   

Russian journalist , the former publisher of Meduza news website, was charged by a Russian court for spreading "fake news" about the massacre in the Ukrainian city of Bucha. 

On 18 May 2022, an administrative offense case of discrediting Russian Armed Forces was filed against Soviet and Russian Rock musician Yuri Shevchuk, the leader of the rock band DDT, after he said at a concert in Ufa: "The motherland, my friends, is not the president’s ass that has to be slobbered and kissed all the time. The motherland is an impoverished old woman at the train station selling potatoes." The case was opened by Police Division №7 of Ufa and was sent to the court of Sovietsky district of Ufa but subsequently had been referred to the court of Dzerzhinsky district of Saint Petersburg. Subsequently, the court returned the case to the Police Division №7 of Ufa due to the lack of description of committed violation in the text of the police protocol. On 15 July 2022, the case came before the court of Dzerzhinsky district of Saint Petersburg again. On 18 July 2022, the court of Dzerzhinsky district of Saint Petersburg again returned the case due to the lack of signature of Shevchuk and of information that he was apprised of his rights in the text of the police protocol. Eventually, on 16 August 2022, the court of Sovietsky district of Ufa found Yuri Shevchuk guilty of discrediting Russian Armed Forces. The fact, that Shevchuk didn't use words "Russian Armed Forces" or similar in his speech at a concert, was not considered important by the court. Shevchuk appealed the judgement.

More than 2,000 people were detained or fined by May 2022 under the laws prohibiting "fake" information about the military.

The first person convicted under the article 207.3 the Criminal Code of the Russian Federation is Pyotr Mylnikov, resident of Olovyannaya, Zabaykalsky Krai, who published in the chat in Viber the documents about mobile crematoriums owned by the Ministry of Defence of the Russian Federation. On 30 May 2022, Olovyanninsky District court found him guilty of dissemination of unreliable information about Russian Armed Forces and its operations and sentenced him to a fine of 1,000,000 rubles.

The first person imprisoned under article 207.3 of the Criminal Code of the Russian Federation is Alexei Gorinov, a deputy at Moscow’s Krasnoselsky district council and 60 years old engineer, lawyer and human rights defender. In the view of the prosecution party, his fault was to speech at council meeting on 15 March 2022: "How can we talk about a children's drawing competition, when children are dying every day?! About 100 children have been  killed in Ukraine, and children are becoming orphans. I believe that all efforts of civil society should be aimed at stopping war and withdraw troops from Ukraine.". On 27 April 2022, Gorinov was detained and taken into custody in Matrosskaya Tishina. During the case hearing, Gorinov maintained his innocence, pointing to his rights to free expression under the Russian constitution, and said from the prisoner's box: "I thought that Russia exhausted its limit on wars back in the 20th century. However, our present is Bucha, Irpin, and Hostomel. Do these names mean something to you? You, my accusers – take an interest and do not say later that you did not know anything.". Forensic expert of the Ministry of Justice stated that only the sentence about killed children contained in Gorinov's speech at counsil meeting is a statement of fact, the rest of the speech is a personal opinion. Despite this conclusion, Gorinov was convicted on 8 July 2022 to a seven-year term. Judge Olesya Mendeleyeva ruled that his motivation was "based on political hatred" and that he had misled Russians, prompting them to "feel anxiety and fear" about the invasion, while a sympathizer said this was "historic hell". Meanwhile, at least 50 other Russians including Alexandra Skochilenko await similar trials.

In June 2022, Russian opposition politician Ilya Yashin was arrested, and later accused under 2022 war censorship laws of disseminating fake news about the Russian Armed Forces. Amnesty International and other organizations have called on the government to free Yashin as they regard his arrest as a violation of his right to freedom of speech. In December 2022, Yashin was sentenced to eight-and-a-half years in prison. 

On 24 August 2022, Russian opposition politician Yevgeny Roizman was detained by police who said he was being charged with "discrediting" the military. He was previously fined three times under the same law.

On 9 September 2022, seven council members from Smolninsky District Council in St. Petersburg passed a resolution which called on the State Duma to impeach president Putin for "high treason" due to his handling of the war in Ukraine. Dmitry Palyuga, a councillor, published a resolution on Twitter which accuse Putin of: "(1) the decimation of young able-bodied Russian men who would serve the workforce better than the military; (2) Russia's economic downturn and brain drain; (3) NATO's expansion eastward, including adding Finland and Sweden to "double" its border with Russia; (4) the opposite effect of the "special military operation" in Ukraine." Subsequently, the Smolninskoye District Court dissolved the Smolninsky municipal council and charged the deputies with "discrediting" Russia's military. 

In September 2022, Russian pop legend Alla Pugacheva spoke out against the invasion, writing that Russians were dying in Ukraine for "illusory goals", and that the invasion was "turning our country into a pariah and worsening the lives of our citizens." Russian authorities began investigating Pugacheva for "discrediting" the military.

In October 2022, Russian actor Artur Smolyaninov was charged for "discrediting" the Russian military – that was after his anti-war-statements and after he had left Russia. He commented; "The laws of this state do not exist for me. They, like the state itself, are inherently criminal, which means they have neither moral nor legal force."

As of December 2022, more than 4,000 people were prosecuted for criticizing the war in Ukraine.

In February 2023, Russian journalist  was sentenced to six years in prison for publishing information about the Mariupol theatre airstrike.

Attempted application against Wikipedia 

In February and March 2022, Russian Wikipedia editors warned their readers and fellow editors of several, reiterated attempts by the Russian government of political censorship, internet propaganda, disinformation, attacks, and disruptive editing towards an article reporting Russian military casualties and Ukrainian civilian casualties of the ongoing war.

On 1 March 2022, Russian state media censorship agency Roskomnadzor threatened to block Wikipedia over the Russian Wikipedia article on Russia's invasion of Ukraine. The claims were raised again on 29 March.

On 11 March, Belarusian political police (GUBOPiK) arrested prominent Belarusian Wikipedia editor Mark Bernstein for the "spread of anti-Russian materials" and violating the "fake news" law. One day prior, the Russian Telegram channel Мракоборец exposed the personal details of the editor, arguing that Bernstein had allegedly made illegal edits to Wikipedia articles about Russia's assault on Ukraine.

On 31 March 2022, Roskomnadzor threatened Wikipedia with a fine of up to 4 million rubles "for failure to remove unreliable socially significant materials, as well as other prohibited information" about the invasion.

On 4 April 2022, Civic Chamber of Russia member  asked the Prosecutor General's Office and Roskomnadzor to investigate Wikipedia for a criminal offence in connection with the dissemination of information about the invasion. On the same day, Roskomnadzor sent a request to the Wikipedia administration to remove information from five articles from Russian Wikipedia: Battle of Kyiv (2022); War crimes in the 2022 Russian invasion of Ukraine; Mariupol hospital airstrike; Mariupol theatre airstrike; and Bucha massacre. On 26 April, a court fined the Wikimedia Foundation 3 million rubles for failing to remove seven Wikipedia articles on the invasion. At the end of May 2022, Roskomnadzor demanded that Wikipedia remove the articles Battle of Kharkiv (2022) and Use of white phosphorus bombs in the 2022 Russian invasion of Ukraine.

In April–July 2022, Russian authorities added several Wikipedia articles to their list of forbidden sites and ordered search engines to mark Wikipedia as a violator of Russian laws.

Perversion of law

The Putin administration was quick to pervert the law which it had passed scant months before. Instead of the legally-mandated "police action" or lexically-approved "special military operation", political scientists favoured by the Kremlin like Sergey Karaganov use the word "war" openly, as in this April 2022 interview: "The stakes of the Russian elite are very high – for them it is an existential war."

On 13 May 2022, former FSB officer and pro-war military blogger Igor Girkin harshly criticized Russian Minister of Defence Sergei Shoigu, accusing him of "criminal negligence" in conducting the invasion. On 23 August Girkin called Putin a clown. After large Ukrainian counteroffensives in September 2022, Girkin called for the Shoigu to be executed by firing squad and publicly expressed the opinion that "The war in Ukraine will continue until the complete defeat of Russia. We have already lost; the rest is just a matter of time." Pro-Kremlin war journalist Alexander Kots publicly stated that "We need to do something about the system where our leadership doesn't like to talk about bad news, and their subordinates don't want to upset their superiors." Unlike the liberal and pro-democracy opposition to Vladimir Putin and independent journalists who are persecuted for criticizing the war in Ukraine or Putin, ultra-nationalists and pro-war activists like Girkin and Kots are considered untouchable because they are protected by high-ranking members of the military and intelligence services. 

On 13 September 2022, Russian Communist Party (KPRF) leader Gennady Zyuganov, told State Duma that the "special military operation" in Ukraine "has turned into a full-fledged war."

Chairman of the State Duma's Defense Committee Andrey Kartapolov said the Russian Defense Ministry should "stop lying" to the public about the situation in Ukraine because "Our people are not stupid. They see that authorities don’t want to tell them even part of the truth. It may lead to a loss of credibility."

On 5 October 2022, Kremlin propagandist Vladimir Solovyov said that some high-ranking Russian commanders should be shot by firing squad. Putin's associate Yevgeny Prigozhin, owner of mercenary group Wagner, said about the commanders of the Russian army that "All these bastards ought to be sent to the front barefoot with just a submachine gun."

Russian President Vladimir Putin, Putin's first deputy chief of staff, Sergei Kiriyenko, and leading pro-Kremlin lawmaker Sergei Mironov were accused of breaking the law. In December 2022, Nikita Yuferev, a deputy of the St. Petersburg Smolninskoye Municipal District, asked Russian authorities to investigate Putin for using the word "war" to describe Russia's invasion of Ukraine. Yuferev posted on Twitter that "there was no decree to end the SVO [the so-called ‘special military operation’], and war was never declared. Several thousand people have already been convicted for such words about war. I’ve asked the authorities look into Putin for spreading fakes about the army."

Reactions
On 14 March 2022, Amnesty International published a statement criticizing Russian laws promulgated on 4 March 2022. Amnesty International strongly condemns the escalating attack against civil society organizations and independent media unleashed by the Russian authorities since the start of Russia's invasion of Ukraine on 24 February 2022, and urges the Russian authorities to abide by their international human rights obligations and Russia's Constitution to respect, protect and fulfill the rights to freedom of expression, association and peaceful assembly, including by allowing peaceful anti-war protests to go ahead unhindered; releasing all peaceful protesters and dropping the charges against them; lifting all restrictions on independent media and overturning or amending all laws that overly and arbitrarily restrict the rights to freedom of expression, association and peaceful assembly. The organization is calling on the international community to stand in solidarity with and provide support to Russian civil society activists, human rights defenders and journalists who are at increased risk for expressing their opposition to Russia's invasion of Ukraine.

Hugh Williamson, Europe and Central Asia director at Human Rights Watch, said that "These new laws are part of Russia’s ruthless effort to suppress all dissent and make sure the [Russian] population does not have access to any information that contradicts the Kremlin’s narrative about the invasion of Ukraine."

See also
 Russian fake news laws
 Media freedom in Russia
 Russian Wikipedia
 Media portrayal of the Ukrainian crisis
 Russian information war against Ukraine
 Political repression in the Soviet Union
 2016–present purges in Turkey

Notes

References

External links
 "Anti-war protests in Russia", Kharkiv Human Rights Protection Group

2022 in law
2022 in Russia
Censorship in Russia
Fake news
Law of Russia
Political repression in Russia
Reactions to the 2022 Russian invasion of Ukraine
Anti-protest law